

Events

January–March 
 January 20 – Charles Elliot of the United Kingdom, and Qishan of the Qing dynasty, agree to the Convention of Chuenpi.
 January 26 – Britain occupies Hong Kong. Later in the year, the first census of the island records a population of about 7,500.
 January 27 – The active volcano Mount Erebus in Antarctica is discovered, and named by James Clark Ross.
 January 28 – Ross discovers the "Victoria Barrier", later known as the Ross Ice Shelf. On the same voyage, he discovers the Ross Sea, Victoria Land and Mount Terror.
 January 30 – A fire ruins and destroys two-thirds of the villa (modern-day city) of Mayagüez, Puerto Rico.
 February 4 – First known reference to Groundhog Day in North America, in the diary of a James Morris.
 February 10 – The Act of Union (British North America Act, 1840) is proclaimed in Canada.
 February 11 – The two colonies of the Canadas are merged, into the United Province of Canada.
 February 18 – The first ongoing filibuster in the United States Senate begins, and lasts until March 11.
 February – El Salvador proclaims itself an independent republic, bringing an end to the (already de facto defunct) Federal Republic of Central America.
 March 4 – William Henry Harrison is sworn in as the ninth President of the United States.
 March 9 – United States v. The Amistad: The Supreme Court of the United States rules in the case, that the Africans who seized control of the ship had been taken into slavery illegally.
 March 12 – , commanded by legendary captain Richard Roberts ("I'd Go to Sea in a Bathtub"), founders in rough seas, with all passengers and crew lost.

April–June 
 April 4 – President William Henry Harrison dies of pneumonia, aged 68, becoming the first President of the United States to die in office, and at one month, the American president with the shortest term served. He is succeeded by Vice President John Tyler, who becomes the tenth President of the United States.
 April 6 – President John Tyler is sworn in.
 May – The Sino-Sikh War begins.
 May 3 – New Zealand becomes a separate British colony, having previously been administered as part of the Colony of New South Wales.
 May 22 – The Georgian province of Guria revolts against the Russian Empire.
 June 6 – The United Kingdom Census is held, the first to record names and approximate ages of every household member, and to be administered nationally.
 June 21 – St. John's College (later Fordham University) is founded in The Bronx, by the Society of Jesus.
 June 28 – The ballet Giselle is first presented by the Ballet du Théâtre de l'Académie Royale de Musique, at the Salle Le Peletier in Paris, France.

July–September 

 July – Scottish missionary David Livingstone arrives at Kuruman in the Northern Cape, his first posting in Africa.
 July 5 – Thomas Cook arranges his first railway excursion, in England.
 July 17 – The first edition of the humorous magazine Punch is published in London.
 July 18 (Sunday)
 Emperor Pedro II of Brazil is crowned in Rio de Janeiro.
 The sixth bishop of Calcutta, Daniel Wilson, and Dr. James Taylor, Civil Surgeon at Dhaka, establish the first modern educational institution on the Indian subcontinent, Dhaka College.
 July 20 – The Mercantile Agency (ancestor of Dun & Bradstreet) is founded in New York City, by Lewis Tappan.
 August 11 – Frederick Douglass speaks in front of the Anti-Slavery Convention in Nantucket, Massachusetts.
 August 16 – U.S. President John Tyler vetoes a bill which called for the re-establishment of the Second Bank of the United States. Enraged Whig Party members riot outside the White House, in the most violent demonstration on White House grounds in U.S. history.
 August 20–October 16 – The Niger expedition of 1841 begins sailing up the Niger River by paddle steamers, under the auspices of the British Society for the Extinction of the Slave Trade and the Civilisation of Africa; it is largely abortive, due to the high incidence of disease among the crews.
 September 24 – Sarawak is broken away from Brunei, and James Brooke is appointed Rajah.

October–December 
 October 10 – First Opium War: Battle of Chinhai – British capture a Chinese garrison.
 October 13 – First Opium War: British occupy Ningbo.
 October 16 – Queen's University is founded in Kingston, Ontario, by Rev. Thomas Liddell, who carries a Royal Charter from Queen Victoria, and becomes the school's first principal.
 October 30 – A fire at the Tower of London destroys its Grand Armoury and causes a quarter of a million pounds' worth of damage.
 November – The settlement of Dallas, Texas, is founded by John Neely Bryan.
 November 13 – Scottish surgeon James Braid first sees a demonstration of animal magnetism by Charles Lafontaine in Manchester, which leads to his study of the phenomenon that he (Braid) eventually calls hypnotism.
 December 20 – The first multilateral treaty for the suppression of the African slave trade, the Treaty for the Suppression of the African Slave Trade, signed in London by the representatives of Austria, Britain, France, Prussia and Russia.
 December 23 – First Anglo-Afghan War: At a meeting with the Afghan general Akbar Khan, British diplomat Sir William Hay Macnaghten is shot dead at close quarters.

Date unknown 
 John Augustus develops the concept of probation in Boston, Massachusetts.

Ongoing 
 First Opium War (1839–42)
 First Anglo-Afghan War (1839–42)

Births

January–June 

 January 8
 Hakeem Noor-ud-Din, Muslim scholar, 1st Caliph of the Ahmadiyya Muslim Community in Islam (d. 1914)
 Kate Stone, American diarist (d. 1907)
 January 14 – Berthe Morisot, French painter (d. 1895)
 January 15 – Frederick Stanley, 16th Earl of Derby, English-Canadian politician, soldier (d. 1908)
 January 23 – Benoît-Constant Coquelin, French actor, Cyrano de Bergerac (d. 1909)
 January 25 – John Fisher, 1st Baron Fisher, British admiral (d. 1920)
 January 27 – Alexandru Candiano-Popescu, Romanian general, lawyer, journalist, and poet (d. 1901)
 January 28 – Sir Henry Morton Stanley, Welsh explorer, journalist (d. 1904)
 January 30 – Félix Faure, President of France (d. 1899)
 February 2 – François-Alphonse Forel, Swiss hydrologist (d. 1912)
 February 4 – Clément Ader, French engineer, inventor, and airplane pioneer (d. 1926)
 February 10 – Alfred Heaver, English property developer (d. 1901)
 February 15 – Manuel Ferraz de Campos Sales, 4th President of Brazil (d. 1913)
 February 16 – Armand Guillaumin, French painter, lithographer (d. 1927)
 February 24 – Carl Gräbe, German chemist (d. 1927)
 February 25 – Pierre-Auguste Renoir, French painter (d. 1919)
 March 1 – Luigi Luzzatti, Italian financier, economist, philosopher, and jurist, 20th Prime Minister of Italy (d. 1927)
 March 8 – Oliver Wendell Holmes Jr., Associate Justice of the Supreme Court of the United States (d. 1935)
 March 15 – Pietro Bonilli, Italian Roman Catholic priest and blessed (d. 1935)
 April 3 – Hermann Carl Vogel, German astrophysicist, astronomer (d. 1907)
 April 9 – William George Aston, British consular official (d. 1911)
 April 13 – Louis-Ernest Barrias, French sculptor (d. 1905)
 May 10 – James Gordon Bennett Jr., American newspaper publisher (d. 1918)
 May 14 – Sir Squire Bancroft, English actor (d. 1926)
 May 15 – Clarence Dutton, American geologist (d. 1912)
 June 1 – Edward Lyon Buchwalter, Union captain in the American Civil War, businessman, and banker (d. 1933)

July–December 

 July 2 – Alexander Mikhaylovich Zaytsev, Russian chemist (d. 1910)
 July 5 – Mary Arthur McElroy, de facto First Lady of the United States (d. 1917)
 August 6 – Florence Baker, Hungarian-born explorer (d. 1916)
 August 10 – Oronhyatekha, Canadian Mohawk physician, CEO of an international benefit society, native statesman, scholar, rights campaigner and international shooter (d. 1907)
 August 14 – Joaquín Vara de Rey y Rubio, Spanish general (d. 1898)
 August 24 – Anna Hierta-Retzius, Swedish women's rights activist (d. 1924)
 August 25 – Emil Kocher, Swiss medical researcher, recipient of the Nobel Prize in Physiology or Medicine (d. 1917)
 August 28 – Louis Le Prince, French inventor, Father of Cinematography (d. 1890)
 September 8
 Antonín Dvořák, Czech composer (d. 1904)
 Charles J. Guiteau, American lawyer, assassin of James A. Garfield (d. 1882)
 September 10 – Yamaji Motoharu, Japanese general (d. 1897)
 September 28 – Georges Clemenceau, French statesman (d. 1929)
 October 4 – Prudente de Morais, 3rd President of Brazil (d. 1902)
 October 7 – King Nicholas I of Montenegro (d. 1921)
 October 16 – Prince Itō Hirobumi, 4-time prime minister of Japan (d. 1909)
 November 6
 Nelson W. Aldrich, Senator from Rhode Island (d. 1915)
 Armand Fallières, 9th President of France (d. 1931)
 November 9 – King Edward VII of the United Kingdom (d. 1910)
 November 13 – Edward Burd Grubb Jr., American Civil War Union Brevet Brigadier General (d.1913)
 November 20 – Sir Wilfrid Laurier, 7th Prime Minister of Canada (d. 1919)
 November 25 – Ernst Schröder, German mathematician and academic (d. 1902)
 December 6 – Frédéric Bazille, French painter (k. 1870)
 December 20 – Ferdinand Buisson, French pacifist, recipient of the Nobel Peace Prize (d. 1932)

Date unknown 
 Arousyak Papazian, Armenian actress, writer (d. 1907)

Deaths

January–June 

 January 15 – Johann Jacob Friedrich Wilhelm Parrot, Baltic-German naturalist, traveller (b. 1792)
 January 20 – Jørgen Jørgensen, Danish adventurer (b. 1780)
 February 12 – Sir Astley Cooper, British surgeon and anatomist (b. 1768)
 February 17 – Ferdinando Carulli, Italian guitarist (b. 1770)
 March 1 – Claude Victor-Perrin, Duc de Belluno, French marshal (b. 1764)
 March 16 – Félix Savart, French physicist (b. 1791)
 April 4 – William Henry Harrison, American military officer and politician, 9th President of the United States (b. 1773)
 April 10 – William Lloyd, Welsh Anglican priest turned schoolteacher, Methodist preacher (b. 1771)
 April 28 – Peter Chanel, French Roman Catholic priest, missionary, and saint (martyred) (b. 1803)
 April 30 – Peter Andreas Heiberg, Danish author, philologist (b. 1758)
 May 13 – Maria Madeline Taylor, Australian stage actor (b. 1805)
 May 16 – Marie Boivin, French midwife, inventor, and obstetrics writer (b. 1773)
 May 20 – Joseph Blanco White, British theologian (b. 1775)
 May 23 – Franz Xaver von Baader, German philosopher, theologian (b. 1765)
 June 1
 Nicolas Appert, French inventor (b. 1749)
 David Wilkie, Scottish artist (b. 1785)

July–December 
 July – Mary Rogers ("Beautiful Cigar Girl"), American murder victim (b. c. 1820)
 August 16 – Fernando Errázuriz Aldunate, Chilean politician, President of Chile (b.c 1777)
 August 24 – Theodore Edward Hook, English author (b. 1788)
 September 25 – John Chandler, American politician (b. 1762)
 October 9 – Karl Friedrich Schinkel, German architect (b. 1781)
 November 18 – Agustín Gamarra, Peruvian general and politician, 10th and 14th President of Peru (b. 1785)
 December 4 – David Daniel Davis, British physician (b. 1777)
 December 23 – William Hay Macnaghten, Anglo-Indian diplomat (b. 1793)

References

Further reading